Anton Schärer (born 1898, date of death unknown) was a Swiss weightlifter. He competed in the men's light-heavyweight event at the 1924 Summer Olympics.

References

External links
 

1898 births
Year of death missing
Swiss male weightlifters
Olympic weightlifters of Switzerland
Weightlifters at the 1924 Summer Olympics
Place of birth missing